Muhammad Surur bin Nayif Zayn al-'Abidin (1938 – 11 November 2016) was a former Syrian Muslim Brotherhood member. He is credited with developing the Salafi Islamist trend that later came to be known as Sururism (or Sururi), which combines "the organisational methods and political worldview of the Muslim Brotherhood with the theological puritanism of Wahhabism." His developed trend is described as being "instrumental in promoting a politicised version of Wahhabism in the [Saudi] kingdom." However, while he supported the non-violent criticism of Muslim rulers, he rejected attempts to overthrow the regimes of Muslim countries as a source of fitna (civil strife and chaos). Surur also wrote a highly popular anti-Shia book called Wa Ja'a Dawr al-Majus (The Era of the Magians Has Come), published in 1984, where he explains that the Iranian Revolution is nothing but the starting point for a strategy of Shiite domination of the Middle East. The book was quoted extensively by Abu Musab al-Zarqawi.

Life
He was born in the Hawran. In the mid-1960s, while still a member of the Syrian Brotherhood, Surur started to criticise the group, e.g. for its toleration of Sufi Brotherhood members. This discord partly led to him settling in Saudi Arabia in 1965. After being expelled from Saudi Arabia in 1974 (due to received reports denouncing his activities as subversive), he moved to Kuwait (where he founded the publishing house Dar al-arqam); later settling in the U.K. in 1984 (where he founded the Center for Islamic Studies), before finally moving to Jordan in 2004.

Influence
Surur admired Muhammad ibn Ibrahim Al ash-Sheikh and was himself initially admired by Abu Muhammad al-Maqdisi—who later considered him to be too lenient towards the Muslim rulers. Surur has also influenced Safar Al-Hawali and Salman al-Ouda.

After the death of Muhammad Surur in Doha, Abdulrazzaq al-Mahdi released condolences upon him and commented on his impact.

Works
Wa Ja'a Dawr al-Majus (The Era of the Magians Has Come)
Al-salafiyya bayna al-wula wal-ghula (Salafism between the Rulers and the Extremists)

See also
Sahwa movement

References

External links
www.surour.net - His website 

1938 births
2016 deaths
Syrian Islamists
Syrian Salafis
Syrian writers
Syrian expatriates in Saudi Arabia
Syrian expatriates in Kuwait
Syrian expatriates in the United Kingdom
Syrian expatriates in Jordan
Critics of Shia Islam
Salafi Islamists
Muslim Brotherhood of Syria politicians
Atharis